Stevan Raičković (Serbian Cyrillic: Стеван Раичковић; 5 July 1928 – 6 May 2007) was a Serbian poet, writer and academic.

Biography
Raičković was born in to a family of teachers which moved a lot around the country as he was growing up. He pursued his gymnasium education in Senta, Kruševac, Smederevo and Subotica, where he graduated in 1947 and started writing for various newspapers at the age of 17 including Politika. Soon after Raičković started his studies at Belgrade Faculty of Philosophy.
His first job was at the redaction of Radio Belgrade and afterwards as an editor in Prosveta  publishing house.

He was elected as a corresponding member of the Serbian Academy of Sciences and Arts in 1972. and a full member nine years later. Some of his awards include: Zmajeva, Neven, Njegoš's award, Goran's wraith ward, Branko Miljkovic award for poetry, Milos N. Djuric award for the best translation, Vuk's award, the 7 July award, October award of cities of Belgrade and Herceg-Novi.

Raičković translated numerous poets including Anna Akhmatova, Marina Tsvetaeva, Joseph Brodsky, Boris Pasternak, Shakespeare's sonnets and Petrarch.

His collected works were published in 1998. and translated in more than 10 languages.

Works

 Detinjstva (1950)
 Pesma tišine (1952)
 Balada o predvečerju (1955)
 Kasno leto (1958)
 Tisa (1961)
 Kamena uspavanka (1963)
 Stihovi (1964)
 Prolazi rekom lađa (1967)
 Varke (1967)
 Zapisi (1971)
 Zapisi o crnom Vladimiru (1971)
 Slučajni memoari (1978)
 Točak za mučenje (1981)
 Panonske ptice (1988)
 Monolog na Topoli (1988)
 Svet oko mene (1988)
 Stihovi iz dnevnika (1990)
 Fascikla 1999/2000 (2004)
 Čarolija o Herceg-Novom (1989)
 Suvišna pesma (1991)
 Kineska priča (1995)
 Intimne mape (1978)
 Zlatna greda (1993)
 Beleške o poeziji (1978)
 Portreti pesnika (1987)
 Dnevnik o poeziji (1990)
 Dnevnik o poeziji II (1997)
 Nulti ciklus (1998)
 U društvu pesnika (2000)
 Slova i besede (2000)
 Linija magle (2001)
 Monolog o poeziji (2001)
 Veliko dvorište (1955)
 Družina pod suncem (1960)
 Gurije (1962)
 Krajcara i druge pesme (1971)
 Vetrenjača (1974)
 Male bajke (1974)
 Slike i prilike (1978)
 Selidba (1983)
 Jedan mogući život (Homo poeticus) (2002)

Translations 
 Shakespeare's sonnets (1964)
 Six Russian poets (1970)
 Love sonnets – Petrarch (1974)
 Slovenske rime (1976)
 Zlatna jesen – selection of poetry by Boris Pasternak (1990)

References

1928 births
2007 deaths
People from Kučevo
Serbian male poets
Serbian children's writers
Members of the Serbian Academy of Sciences and Arts
Serbian writers
Burials at Belgrade New Cemetery